Capoeta tinca, or the Anatolian khramulya  or western fourbarbel scraper,  is a species of cyprinid fish endemic to Turkey, inhabiting swiftly flowing rivers.

It is known from rivers draining north to the Sea of Marmara. Earlier Capoeta tinca was thought to be more widespread across Turkey and Georgia, but in 2006 it was divided into three distinct species, Capoeta baliki, Capoeta banarescui and Capoeta tinca.

References 

Tinca
Endemic fauna of Turkey
Taxa named by Johann Jakob Heckel
Fish described in 1843